Vasyl Semenovych Stus (6 January 1938, Rakhnivka, Ukrainian SSR – 4 September 1985, Perm-36, Kuchino, Russian SFSR) was a Ukrainian poet, translator, literary critic, journalist, and an active member of the Ukrainian dissident movement. For his political convictions, his works were banned by the Soviet regime and he spent 13 years in detention until his death in Perm-36—then a Soviet forced labor camp for political prisoners, subsequently The Museum of the History of Political Repression—after having declared a hunger strike on September 4, 1985. On November 26, 2005, the Ukrainian president Viktor Yushchenko posthumously awarded him the highest national title: Hero of Ukraine. Stus is widely regarded as one of Ukraine's foremost poets.

Biography
Vasyl Stus was born on January 6, 1938, into a peasant family in the village of Rakhnivka, Haisyn Raion, Vinnytsia Oblast (modern Ukraine) (province), Ukrainian SSR. The following year, his parents Semen Demyanovych and Iryna Yakivna moved to the city of Stalino (now Donetsk). Their children joined them one year later. Vasyl first encountered the Ukrainian language and poetry from his mother who sang him Ukrainian folk songs.

After secondary school, Vasyl Stus entered the Department of History and Literature of the Pedagogical Institute in Stalino (nowadays Donetsk University). In 1959 he graduated from the Institute with honours. Following graduation, Stus briefly worked as a high school teacher of the Ukrainian language and literature in Tauzhnia village of Kirovohrad Oblast, and then was conscripted into the Soviet Army for two years. While studying at the university and during his military service in the Ural mountains, he started to write poetry and translated into Ukrainian more than a hundred verses by Johann Wolfgang von Goethe and Rainer Maria Rilke. The original copies of his translations were later confiscated by the KGB, and were lost.

After his military service, Stus worked as an editor for the newspaper Sotsialistychnyi Donbas (Socialist Donbas) between 1960 and 1963. In 1963, he entered a Doctoral (PhD) program at the Shevchenko Institute of Literature of Ukrainian Academy of Sciences in Kyiv. At the same time, he published his selected poetry.

In 1965, Stus married Valentyna Popeliukh; his son, Dmytro was born in 1966.

On September 4, 1965, during the premiere of Sergei Parajanov's film Shadows of Forgotten Ancestors in Kyiv's Ukrayina cinema, Vasyl Stus took part in a protest against the arrests of Ukrainian intelligentsia. As a result, he was expelled from the Institute on September 30 and later lost his job at the State Historical Archive. After that, he worked on a building site, a fireman, and an engineer, continuing his intensive work on poetry. In 1965, he submitted his first book Circulation (Круговерть) to a publisher, but it was rejected due to its discrepancy with Soviet ideology and artistic style. His next book of poetry Winter Trees (Зимові дерева) was also rejected, regardless of positive reviews from the poet Ivan Drach and the critic Eugen Adelgejm. In 1970, the book was published in Belgium.

On January 12, 1972, Stus was arrested for "anti-Soviet agitation and propaganda". He served a five-year sentence in a labor camp, and two-year exile in Magadan Oblast.

   

In August 1979, having finished his sentence, he returned to Kyiv and worked in a foundry. He spoke out in defense of members of the Ukrainian Helsinki group (UHG). Stus himself joined the UHG in October 1979.

“In Kyiv I learned that people close to the Helsinki Group were being repressed in the most flagrant manner. This at least had been the case in the trials of Ovsiyenko, Horbal, Lytvyn, and they were soon to deal similarly with Chornovil and Rozumny. I didn’t want that kind of Kyiv. Seeing that the Group had been left rudderless, I joined it because I couldn’t do otherwise … When life is taken away, I had no need of pitiful crumbs. Psychologically I understood that the prison gates had already opened for me and that any day now they would close behind me – and close for a long time. But what was I supposed to do? Ukrainians were not able to leave the country, and anyway I didn’t particularly want to go beyond those borders since who then, here, in Great Ukraine, would become the voice of indignation and protest?  This was my fate, and you don’t choose your fate. You accept it, whatever that fate may be. And when you don’t accept it, it takes you by force … However I had no intention of bowing my head down, whatever happened.  Behind me was Ukraine, my oppressed people, whose honour I had to defend or perish". (“Z tabornoho zoshyta" [“From the camp notebook"], 1983).

On 14 May 1980, prior to the 1980 Olympic Games in Moscow, he was arrested and received a 10-year sentence for "anti-Soviet activity". The later influential (in Ukrainian politics) Viktor Medvedchuk defended Stus during this trial in 1980. In the closing speech from the defence Medvedchuk stated all of Stus' crimes deserved punishment; however, he also told the court that the defendant fulfilled his daily norm at the factory where he worked at the time, despite serious stomach problems. Stus' requests to get another public defender were dismissed by the court. In a 2018 interview with The Independent Dissident Yevhen Sverstyuk also recalled: "When Stus met with his appointed lawyer, he immediately felt that Medvedchuk was a man of the Komsomol-aggressive type, that he did not protect him, did not want to understand him and, in fact, was not interested in his case." Medvedchuk claimed he could not have operated differently: “Stus denounced the Soviet government, and didn’t consider it to be legitimate. Everyone decides their own fate. Stus admitted he agitated against the Soviet government. He was found guilty by the laws of the time. When the laws changed, the case was dropped. Unfortunately, he died.”

Vasyl Stus died after he declared hunger strike on September 4, 1985, in a Soviet forced labor camp for political prisoners Perm-36 near the village of Kuchino, Perm Oblast, Russian SFSR, where he had been transferred in November 1980. Danylo Shumuk reported that the commandant, Major Zhuravkov, committed suicide after the death of Stus. In the Kuchino camp, out of 56 inmates kept there between 1980 and 1987, eight died, including four members of the Ukrainian Helsinki Group.

In August 1990 the Supreme Court of the Soviet Union canceled Stus' verdict and the case was closed due to lack of evidence.

Legacy

In 1985, an international committee of scholars, writers, and poets nominated Stus for the 1986 Nobel Prize in Literature, but he died before the nomination materialized.

On 19 November 1989 the remains of Vasyl Stus, Oleksa Tykhy and Yury Lytvyn were brought back to Kyiv and reburied at the Baikove Cemetery in a ceremony attended by more than 30,000 people.

In January 1989, the first non-governmental Vasyl Stus Prizes were awarded for “talent and courage". This Prize was set up by the Ukrainian Association of the Independent Creative Intelligentsia, and is awarded every year on the poet's date of birth in Lviv. In 1993 Stus was posthumously awarded the Taras Shevchenko State Prize for Literature.

On 8 January 2008, the National Bank of Ukraine issued a commemorative coin dedicated to Vasyl Stus and on 25 January 2008 Ukrposhta issued a stamp in his memory.

In December 2008, a group of current and former students of the Donetsk National University sent an appeal to the Minister of Education, Ivan Vakarchuk, asking that the university be named after one of its alumni, Vasyl Stus. The Minister supported the initiative and approached the Rector of the university with a request to discuss the issue among staff and at the academic council. On 17 February 2009 62 out of 63 members of the university's academic council voted against renaming the university to Vasyl Stus or Volodomyr Degtyaryov (61 voted against this), 63 voted for not changing the name of the institute. On 13 February 2009, representatives of the university's students voted in the same fashion. The Donetsk National University, relocated to Vinnytsia due to the War in Donbass, was eventually renamed named after Stus on 10 June 2016. The new name was approved by 75 votes out of 105 of the university's academic council.

After it was taken over by the pro-Russian rebels during the War in Donbas, the university building in Donetsk removed its commemorative plaque of Stus in 2015.

Stus is highly regarded among intellectuals in Ukraine.

Dozens of streets all over Ukraine are named in Vasyl Stus's honor, and the Kyiv Metro station Ploshcha Lva Tolstoho was voted to be renamed after him in a poll taken during the 2022 Russian invasion of Ukraine.

Vasyl Stus's second trial was discussed on The Rachel Maddow Show in May 2017.

In October 2020, a Ukrainian court banned the distribution of Vakhtang Kipiani's book, The Case of Vasyl Stus, following a complaint by Viktor Medvedchuk. Medvedchuk was Stus' court appointed lawyer.

In March 2021, the Court of Appeal of Kyiv overturned the decision of the court of first instance to ban the publication and almost completely satisfied the complaint of the Vivat publishing house and the author of the book Vakhtang Kipiani. The first-instance court's ban on the distribution of the book and the use of Medvedchuk's name was also lifted. The publishing house announced its readiness to print a new edition of the book. Medvedchuk was fined 140,000 hryvnias as compensation for the publishing house's costs for handling the case. Medvedchuk did not appeal this court decision within the prescribed period, and thus it is considered final and entered into legal force.

Awards 
 Antonovych prize (1982)

Poetry in English translations
 "The Lord Has Started Being Born Within Me" in Poetry London, Spring 2022, Issue 101. Translated by Alan Zhukovski.
 "A Stranger Lives My Life and Wears My Body" in Poetry International. Translated by Alan Zhukovski.
 "This Pain Is Like the Wine of Dying Throes" in The London Magazine, February/March 2019. Translated by Alan Zhukovski.
 "I cross the edge..." in Ukrainian Literature. A Journal of Translations, Volume 4, 2014. Translated by Artem Pulemotov.
 "So many words; they are like crippled ghosts!" in World Literature Today, March 16, 2022. Translated by Artem Pulemotov.
 "I wandered through the city of my youth..." and "One-thousand-year-old Kyiv" in Apofenie. Translated by Bohdan Tokarskyi and Uilleam Blacker.

Further reading

External links

Vasys Ovsienko. The death of Vasyl Stus in Zerkalo Nedeli, September 7–13, 2002. Available in Russian  and Ukrainian.
 Vasyl Stus -- A Life Remembered
 Selected collection of poems by Vasyl Stus  
 Vasyl Stus Biography 
 The GULAG Museus at Perm-36 (a special labor camp for political prisoners where Vasyl Stus was retained)
 Вахтанг Кіпіані, Стус і Нобель. Демістифікація міфу , Ukrayinska Pravda, July 22, 2006 
 Vasyl Stus Facebook Pro Vasyl Stus activist site 
 Ukrainian art songs on poetry of Vasyl Stus

References and footnotes

1938 births
1985 deaths
People from Vinnytsia Oblast
Donetsk National University alumni
Ukrainian poets
20th-century poets
Ukrainian dissidents
Soviet dissidents
Ukrainian Helsinki Group
Ukrainian human rights activists
Soviet human rights activists
Recipients of the title of Hero of Ukraine
Recipients of the Shevchenko National Prize
Recipients of the Order of Prince Yaroslav the Wise, 5th class
Ukrainian murder victims
Soviet people who died in prison custody
Ukrainian people who died in Soviet detention
Burials at Baikove Cemetery